Class of 2017 is a 2017 Hindi web series created and produced by Vikas Gupta for Ekta Kapoor's video on demand platform ALTBalaji. The web series revolves around the lives of a few teenagers who get intertwined with drugs, sex, peer pressure and anxiety. The series is loosely based on Hip Hip Hurray. It is mainly available for streaming on the ALT Balaji App and its associated websites since its release date. Its sequel series Class of 2020 started streaming on ALTBalaji from 4 February 2020.

Plot
The series revolves around the lives of a few teenagers who get intertwined with drugs, sex, peer pressure and anxiety. It explores how they crumble and later overcome teenage problems while learning about life.

Cast 
 Anshuman Malhotra  as Siddharth
 Krissann Barretto as Sarah
 Rohan Shah as Nikhil
 Adhish Khanna as Shaurya
 Kajol Tyagi as Swati
 Sarah Khatri as Riya
 Pooja Jadhav as Minnie
 Rohit Suchanti as Jai
 Deena Hasan as Amanda
 Jahangir Kakaria as Behzaad (Principal)
 Roopa Ganguly as Frida (Teacher)
 Sikandar Khan as Tiwari (Teacher)
 Rosemary Fernandes  as The Bride, Payal Ma'am
 Gaurav Sharma as Amaan
 Ashish Chanchlani as Ishaan

Episodes

 Episode 1: Kavita Ki Kahaani
 Episode 2: Behzaad Ka Aatank
 Episode 3: Baba Ki Booty
 Episode 4: The Younger The Better
 Episode 5: But That's Your Boob!!!
 Episode 6: Magic Pills
 Episode 7: Love Game Begins
 Episode 8: Lap Dance!
 Episode 9: Rose Day
 Episode 10: Humans Need Sex!
 Episode 11: Stop Being Slutty
 Episode 12: Rajma Chawal
 Episode 13: Mystery Man
 Episode 14: Bro's Before Hoe's
 Episode 15: Under My Pants
 Episode 16: Am I An Alien?
 Episode 17: Love is Chu@*#!#pa
 Episode 18: Superman
 Episode 19: Safety Net
 Episode 20: Season Finale: Bon Voyage

Sequel
Class of 2017's Sequel Series Class of 2020 series started streaming on ALTBalaji from 4 February 2020.

References

External links
 Watch Class of 2017 on ALT Balaji website
 

2017 web series debuts
Hindi-language web series
ALTBalaji original programming
Indian drama web series
Indian LGBT-related web series